Maurice Johnston may refer to:

Maurice Robert Johnston (born 1929), British Army general 
Mo Johnston (born 1963), Scottish footballer

See also
Maurice Johnson (disambiguation)